Eduard Tismănaru (born 25 May 1987 in Oneşti, Romania) is a Romanian footballer currently under contract with Liga IV-Bacău County side Vulturul Măgirești.

References

External links
 

1987 births
Living people
Romanian footballers
Association football midfielders
Liga I players
Liga II players
ASC Oțelul Galați players
AFC Dacia Unirea Brăila players
CSM Jiul Petroșani players
FCM Bacău players
CS Aerostar Bacău players
Romanian expatriate footballers
Romanian expatriate sportspeople in Norway
Expatriate footballers in Norway
People from Onești